The Bristol and Exeter Railway 2-4-0 locomotives were two classes of  broad gauge steam locomotives.

On 1 January 1876 the Bristol and Exeter Railway was amalgamated with the Great Western Railway, after which the locomotives were given new numbers. They were used as pilot engines at large stations and on other light duties shared with the GWR Hawthorn Class.

List of locomotives

Broad gauge

The first ten locomotives were introduced in 1870 to replace 1849 built 4-2-2s. The last of the locomotives were withdrawn at the end of the broad gauge on 20 May 1892.

 2 (1872 – 1888) GWR No. 2015
 4 (1871 – 1892) GWR No. 2016
 5 (1871 – 1892) GWR No. 2017
 6 (1870 – 1890) GWR No. 2018
 8 (1872 – 1889) GWR No. 2019
 14 (1870 – 1892) GWR No. 2020
 43 (1871 – 1892) GWR No. 2021
 44 (1870 – 1888) GWR No. 2022
 45 (1870 – 1888) GWR No. 2023
 46 (1870 – 1889) GWR No. 2024

Convertible

Three more locomotives were built in 1874. These were designed to be converted to standard gauge but this was never carried out, the locomotives all being withdrawn by 1886.
 11 (1874 – 1886) GWR No. 2025
 20 (1874 – 1886) GWR No. 2026
 34 (1875 – 1884) GWR No. 2027

References
 
 

Broad gauge (7 feet) railway locomotives
2-4-0 locomotives
Bristol and Exeter Railway locomotives
Railway locomotives introduced in 1870
Scrapped locomotives